In statistical mechanics, an Ursell function or connected correlation function, is a cumulant of a random variable. It can often be obtained by summing over connected Feynman diagrams (the sum over all Feynman diagrams gives the correlation functions).

The Ursell function was named after Harold Ursell, who introduced it in 1927.

Definition

If X is a random variable, the moments sn and cumulants (same as the Ursell functions) un are functions of X related by the exponential formula:

 

(where  is the expectation).

The Ursell functions for multivariate random variables are defined analogously to the above, and in the same way as multivariate cumulants.

The Ursell functions of a single random variable X are obtained from these by setting .

The first few are given by

Characterization

 showed that the Ursell functions, considered as multilinear functions of several random variables, are uniquely determined up to a constant by the fact that they vanish whenever the variables Xi can be divided into two nonempty independent sets.

See also

 Cumulant

References

 

Statistical mechanics
Theory of probability distributions